Bruno Silva may refer to:
Bruno Silva (fighter), Brazilian middleweight mixed martial artist, born 1989
Bruno Gustavo da Silva, Brazilian flyweight mixed martial artist, born 1990
Bruno Silva (footballer, born 1980), Uruguayan footballer
Bruno Silva (footballer, born 1986), Brazilian footballer who plays for Avai
Bruno Silva (footballer, born 1988), Brazilian footballer who plays for Guarani
Bruno (footballer, born 1989), Brazilian footballer who played in Japan
Bruno Silva (footballer, born April 1991), Brazilian footballer who plays for União Suzano
Bruno Silva (footballer, born May 1991), Portuguese footballer who plays for Almancilense
Bruno Silva (footballer, born 1992), Brazilian footballer, full name Bruno da Silva Fonseca, who plays for C.D. Mafra
Bruno Silva (footballer, born 1994), Portuguese footballer
Bruno Silva (footballer, born 2000), Brazilian footballer who plays for Chapecoense
Bruno Silva (cyclist), Portuguese cyclist